

The Deekay Knight was a British two-seat cabin monoplane designed by S.C.Hart-Still and built in 1937 by the Deekay Aircraft Corporation at Broxbourne in Hertfordshire, England. It was built to test methods of wing construction that would later be suitable for plastic skinning.

Development
The Knight was a conventional looking low-wing monoplane, with a fixed tailwheel landing gear, the main legs housed in trouser fairings and powered by a nose-mounted 90 hp (67 kW) Blackburn Cirrus Minor piston engine. It had an enclosed cabin with side-by-side seating for two. It had an unusual wing construction which used four spars and interspars instead of ribs.  Though the wing was made of wood throughout, with a stressed plywood skin, the purpose of its novel construction was to explore methods suitable for later use with plastic materials.  The wing was tested at the Royal Aircraft Establishment Farnborough and the root fittings but not the wing failed at 12.3 times the weight of the aircraft, well beyond the target load factor of 9. Only one aircraft, registered G-AFBA, was built which was scrapped sometime during the Second World War.

Specifications

References

Works cited
 

1930s British civil utility aircraft
Low-wing aircraft
Single-engined tractor aircraft
Aircraft first flown in 1937